Egypt's Ten Greatest Discoveries is a documentary on the Discovery Channel, written and directed by Ben Mole and hosted by Zahi Hawass, featuring a list of the top ten discoveries of Ancient Egyptian sites and artifacts which are of cultural significance to the country. The list was compiled by Hawass with the assistance of some of the world's leading Egyptologists. Each discovery has a theme centered on a part of everyday life in Ancient Egypt. For six of those discoveries, a certain emphasis is placed on how some of their themes have managed to influence modern life. The documentary concludes with a short segment on how the practice of mummification influenced modern surgery, with both procedures sharing much of the same techniques.

The List
The list of discoveries presented on the show. The discoveries are listed in the order they were presented.

External links
Discovery Educator Network Blog Network: Dig in to Ancient Egypt

Discovery Channel original programming